A chemical file format is a type of data file which is used specifically to depicting molecular data. One of the most widely used is the chemical table file format, which is similar to Structure Data Format (SDF) files. They are text files that represent multiple chemical structure records and associated data fields. The XYZ file format is a simple format that usually gives the number of atoms in the first line, a comment on the second, followed by a number of lines with atomic symbols (or atomic numbers) and cartesian coordinates. The Protein Data Bank Format is commonly used for proteins but is also used for other types of molecules. There are many other types which are detailed below. Various software systems are available to convert from one format to another.

Distinguishing formats
Chemical information is usually provided as files or streams and many formats have been created, with varying degrees of documentation. The format is indicated in three ways:(see )
 file extension (usually 3 letters). This is widely used, but fragile as common suffixes such as ".mol" and ".dat" are used by many systems, including non-chemical ones.
 self-describing files where the format information is included in the file. Examples are CIF and CML.
 chemical/MIME type added by a chemically-aware server.

Chemical Markup Language 

Chemical Markup Language (CML) is an open standard for representing molecular and other chemical data. The open source project includes XML Schema, source code for parsing and working with CML data, and an active community. The articles Tools for Working with Chemical Markup Language and XML for Chemistry and Biosciences discusses CML in more detail. CML data files are accepted by many tools, including JChemPaint, Jmol, XDrawChem and MarvinView.

Protein Data Bank Format

The Protein Data Bank Format is commonly used for proteins but it can be used for other types of molecules as well. It was originally designed as, and continues to be, a fixed-column-width format and thus officially has a built-in maximum number of atoms, of residues, and of chains; this resulted in splitting very large structures such as ribosomes into multiple files.  However, many tools can read files that exceed those limits. For example, the E. coli 70S ribosome was represented as 4 PDB files in 2009: 3I1M, 3I1N, 3I1O and 3I1P. In 2014 they were consolidated into a single file, 4V6C.

Some PDB files contain an optional section describing atom connectivity as well as position. Because these files are sometimes used to describe macromolecular assemblies or molecules represented in explicit solvent, they can grow very large and are often compressed. Some tools, such as Jmol and KiNG, can read PDB files in gzipped format. The wwPDB maintains the specifications of the PDB file format and its XML alternative, PDBML. There was a fairly major change in PDB format specification (to version 3.0) in August 2007, and a remediation of many file problems in the existing database.  The typical file extension for a PDB file is .pdb, although some older files use .ent or .brk. Some molecular modeling tools write nonstandard PDB-style files that adapt the basic format to their own needs.

GROMACS format
The GROMACS file format family was created for use with the molecular simulation software package GROMACS. It closely resembles the PDB format but was designed for storing output from molecular dynamics simulations, so it allows for additional numerical precision and optionally retains information about particle velocity as well as position at a given point in the simulation trajectory. It does not allow for the storage of connectivity information, which in GROMACS is obtained from separate molecule and system topology files. The typical file extension for a GROMACS file is .gro.

CHARMM format
The CHARMM molecular dynamics package can read and write a number of standard chemical and biochemical file formats; however, the CARD (coordinate) and PSF (protein structure file) are largely unique to CHARMM. The CARD format is fixed-column-width, resembles the PDB format, and is used exclusively for storing atomic coordinates. The PSF file contains atomic connectivity information (which describes atomic bonds) and is required before beginning a simulation. The typical file extensions used are .crd and .psf respectively.

GSD format
The General Simulation Data (GSD) file format created for efficient reading / writing of generic particle simulations, primarily - but not restricted to - those from HOOMD-blue. The package also contains a python module that reads and writes hoomd schema gsd files with an easy to use syntax.

Ghemical file format
The Ghemical software can use OpenBabel to import and export a number of file formats. However, by default, it uses the GPR format. This file is composed of several parts, separated by a tag (!Header, !Info, !Atoms, !Bonds, !Coord, !PartialCharges and !End).

The proposed MIME type for this format is application/x-ghemical.

SYBYL Line Notation
SYBYL Line Notation (SLN) is a chemical line notation. Based on SMILES, it incorporates a complete syntax for specifying relative stereochemistry. SLN has a rich query syntax that allows for the specification of Markush structure queries. The syntax also supports the specification of combinatorial libraries of ChemDraw.

Example SLNs

SMILES 

The Simplified Molecular Input Line Entry System (SMILES) is a line notation for molecules. SMILES strings include connectivity but do not include 2D or 3D coordinates.

Hydrogen atoms are not represented. Other atoms are represented by their element symbols B, C, N, O, F, P, S, Cl, Br, and I. The symbol "=" represents double bonds and "#" represents triple bonds. Rings are indicated by pairs of digits.

Some examples are

XYZ
The XYZ file format is a simple format that usually gives the number of atoms in the first line, a comment on the second, followed by a number of lines with atomic symbols (or atomic numbers) and cartesian coordinates.

MDL number
The MDL number contains a unique identification number for each reaction and variation. The format is RXXXnnnnnnnn. R indicates a reaction, XXX indicates which database contains the reaction record. The numeric portion, nnnnnnnn, is an 8-digit number.

Other common formats

One of the most widely used industry standards are chemical table file formats, like the Structure Data Format (SDF) files. They are text files that adhere to a strict format for representing multiple chemical structure records and associated data fields. The format was originally developed and published by Molecular Design Limited (MDL). MOL is another file format from MDL.  It is documented in Chapter 4 of CTfile Formats.

PubChem also has XML and ASN1 file formats, which are export options from the PubChem online database.  They are both text based (ASN1 is most often a binary format).

There are a large number of other formats listed in the table below

Converting between formats

OpenBabel and JOELib are freely available open source tools specifically designed for converting between file formats.  Their chemical expert systems support a large atom type conversion tables.

obabel -i input_format input_file -o output_format output_file
For example, to convert the file epinephrine.sdf in SDF to CML use the command

obabel -i sdf epinephrine.sdf -o cml epinephrine.cml

The resulting file is epinephrine.cml.

IOData is a free and open-source Python library for parsing, storing, and converting various file formats commonly used by quantum chemistry, molecular dynamics, and plane-wave density-functional-theory software programs. It also supports a flexible framework for generating input files for various software packages. For a complete list of supported formats, please go to https://iodata.readthedocs.io/en/latest/formats.html.

A number of tools intended for viewing and editing molecular structures are able to read in files in a number of formats and write them out in other formats.  The tools JChemPaint (based on the Chemistry Development Kit), XDrawChem (based on OpenBabel), Chime, Jmol, Mol2mol and Discovery Studio fit into this category.

The Chemical MIME Project

"Chemical MIME" is a de facto approach for adding MIME types to chemical streams.
This project started in January 1994, and was first announced during the Chemistry workshop at the First WWW International Conference, held at CERN in May 1994. ... The first version of an Internet draft was published during May–October 1994, and the second revised version during April–September 1995. A paper presented to the CPEP (Committee on Printed and Electronic Publications) at the IUPAC meeting in August 1996 is available for discussion.
In 1998 the work was formally published in the JCIM.

Support

For Linux/Unix, configuration files are available as a "chemical-mime-data" package in .deb, RPM and tar.gz formats to register chemical MIME types on a web server. Programs can then register as viewer, editor or processor for these formats so that full support for chemical MIME types is available.

Sources of chemical data

Here is a short list of sources of freely available molecular data. There are many more resources than listed here out there on the Internet.  Links to these sources are given in the references below.

 The US National Institute of Health PubChem database is a huge source of chemical data. All of the data is in two-dimensions. Data includes SDF, SMILES, PubChem XML, and PubChem ASN1 formats.
The worldwide Protein Data Bank (wwPDB) is an excellent source of protein and nucleic acid molecular coordinate data. The data is three-dimensional and provided in Protein Data Bank (PDB) format.
eMolecules is a commercial database for molecular data.  The data includes a two-dimensional structure diagram and a smiles string for each compound.  eMolecules supports fast substructure searching based on parts of the molecular structure.
ChemExper is a commercial data base for molecular data.  The search results include a two-dimensional structure diagram and a mole file for many compounds.
New York University Library of 3-D Molecular Structures.
The US Environmental Protection Agency's The Distributed Structure-Searchable Toxicity (DSSTox) Database Network is a project of EPA's Computational Toxicology Program.  The database provides SDF molecular files with a focus on carcinogenic and otherwise toxic substances.

See also

 File format
 OpenBabel, JOELib, OELib
 Chemistry Development Kit
 Chemical Markup Language
 Software for molecular modeling
 NCI/CADD Chemical Identifier Resolver

References

External links